"Four and twenty blackbirds" is a line from the English nursery rhyme "Sing a Song of Sixpence"

Four and Twenty Blackbirds may also refer to:

Literature
Four-and-Twenty Blackbirds, a children's story book by Edward Thomas (1915)
Four and Twenty Blackbirds, a picture book by Robert Lawson and winner of an inaugural Caldecott honor
Four-and-Twenty Blackbirds (retitled The Secret of Galleybird Pit), a novel by Malcolm Saville (1959)
"Four and Twenty Blackbirds", a short story by Agatha Christie from the anthology The Adventure of the Christmas Pudding (1960)
"Four and Twenty Blackbirds", a book by Australian poet Francis Brabazon (1975)
"The Case of the Four and Twenty Blackbirds", a short story by Neil Gaiman from the anthology M Is for Magic (1984)
Four-and-Twenty Blackbirds, a book by Mercedes Lackey (1997)
Four & Twenty Blackbirds (novel), by Cherie Priest (2000)

Television
"Four and Twenty Blackbirds", an episode of the British television series Agatha Christie's Poirot based on the short story (1989)
"Four and Twenty Blackbirds", an episode of the British television series The Chief (1994)
"Four and Twenty Blackbirds", an episode of the British television series Wycliffe (1995)
"Twenty-Four Japanese Thrushes" (originally "Four and Twenty Blackbirds"), an episode of the Japanese anime series Agatha Christie's Great Detectives Poirot and Marple (2005)

See also
Four and Twenty Blackbirds Soaring, a book of poetry by Louis Daniel Brodsky (1989)
Four'n Twenty, an Australian brand of meat pies and sausage rolls